Basil Gordon Short (born  in Vryheid, South Africa) is a South African rugby union player who last played for the . His regular position is prop.

Career

Youth

He also played Varsity Cup rugby for the Pretoria-based university side  between 2012 and 2014, picking up a winner's medal in the first two seasons. He was also included in a South African Universities side in 2013.

Blue Bulls

His first class debut came during the 2012 Vodacom Cup competition. He came off the bench during the second half of their match against  at Loftus Versfeld.

A further two appearances followed during the 2013 Vodacom Cup competition and an additional seven in the 2014 Vodacom Cup.

Boland Cavaliers

He joined Wellington-based side  for the 2016 season.

References

1991 births
Living people
People from Vryheid
White South African people
South African rugby union players
Rugby union props
Blue Bulls players
Rugby union players from KwaZulu-Natal